Australia competed at the 1954 British Empire and Commonwealth Games in Vancouver, Canada from 30 July to 7 August 1954. It was Australia's fifth appearance at the Commonwealth Games, having competed at every Games since their inception in 1930.

Australia won medals in nine of the ten sports that it entered.

Medallists

|  style="text-align:left; width:78%; vertical-align:top;"|

| width="22%" align="left" valign="top" |

Team Management
Honorary General Manager and Chief of Mission - Jim Eve 
Honorary Assistant General Manager - Edward Kenny 
Honorary Manageress - Norah Morison
Section Officials: Athletics Manager - Frank Treacy, Athletics Women's Coach - Nell Gould ; Lawn Bowls Manager - Frederick Winn ; Boxing, Weightlifting & Wrestling Manager - Herbert Keenan ; Cycling Manager - Bill Young ; Fencing Coach - Joan Beck ; Rowing Manager - Roy Thursfield ; Swimming Manager - William Holland

See also
 Australia at the 1952 Summer Olympics
 Australia at the 1956 Summer Olympics

References

External links 
Commonwealth Games Australia Results Database

1954
Nations at the 1954 British Empire and Commonwealth Games
British Empire and Commonwealth Games